St. John Apostle and Evangelist is a Roman Catholic Asturian pre-Romanesque church situated in Santianes de Pravia, northern Spain.

Cultural references

The church contains a foundation stone in the form of a letter labyrinth ("Silo Princeps Fecit") that records the 8th-century founding of the church by King Silo of Asturias. The inscription Silo princeps fecit singularly combined in fifteen horizontal lines and nineteen perpendicular columns of letters. The T forms the beginning and the end of the first and last line in consequence of which the name Silo is not to be found till the eighth line and the S which begins it is exactly in the centre of that line and of the tenth column thus the name is in the shape of a cross as the letters above below and on each side of the S form the word Silo.

This letter labyrinth appears to inspire the hypercube of Salvador Dalí's painting A Propos of the "Treatise on Cubic Form" by Juan de Herrera, housed in the Museo Reina Sofia, Madrid.

See also
Asturian architecture
Catholic Church in Spain

References

External links 

 https://archive.org/details/moslemarchitectu00rivouoft

8th-century churches in Spain
8th-century establishments in Spain
Churches completed in 783
Juan Apostol y Evangelista
Pre-Romanesque architecture in Asturias
Bien de Interés Cultural landmarks in Asturias